Nicholas James Maxwell Timmins is a British author and journalist who writes about the welfare state and the National Health Service.

Biography
Timmins attended Kingswood School in Bath, followed by Regent's Park College, Oxford, where he graduated with a degree in English Language & Literature in 1971.

Career
He was the Health and Social Services Correspondent of The Times and then The Independent. From 1996 to 2011 he was public policy editor of the Financial Times. He is now a senior fellow at the Institute for Government and the King’s Fund and a Senior Associate of the Nuffield Trust www.nuffieldtrust.org.uk.

Bibliography
The Five Giants, A biography of the Welfare State, Fontana Press, 1996, 
Glaziers and window breakers, The role of the Secretary of State for Health, in their own words, Health Foundation, 2015
 The Covid-19 vaccination programme: Trials, tribulations and successes. Health Foundation 2022

References

Living people
English political journalists
Alumni of Regent's Park College, Oxford
Financial Times people
Year of birth missing (living people)